The 1990 IBM ATP Tour was the first season of the ATP Tour, the newly formed tennis circuit which came in to replace the Grand Prix and WCT tournaments. It was the elite tour for professional tennis organized by the Association of Tennis Professionals. In 1990 the IBM ATP Tour included the four Grand Slam tournaments (organized by the International Tennis Federation (ITF)), the ATP Tour World Championships, the ATP Championship Series, Single-Week, the ATP Championship Series and the ATP World Series. The World Team Cup, Davis Cup (organized by the ITF) and Grand Slam Cup (organized by the ITF) are included in this calendar but did not count towards the Tour.

Schedule 
This is the complete schedule of events on the 1990 IBM ATP Tour, with player progression documented from the quarterfinals stage.

Key

January

February

March

April

May

June

July

August

September

October

November

December

ATP rankings

Statistical information 
List of players and titles won, alphabetically by last name:

  Andre Agassi - San Francisco, Miami Masters, Washington, D.C., Season-Ending Championships (4)
  Ronald Agénor - Genova, Berlin (2)
  Juan Aguilera - Nice, Hamburg Masters (2)
  Pieter Aldrich - Newport (1)
  Alex Antonitsch - Seoul (1)
  Jordi Arrese - San Remo, Prague (2)
  Boris Becker - Brussels, Stuttgart, Indianapolis, Sydney Indoors, Stockholm Masters (5)
  Pat Cash - Hong Kong (1)
  Michael Chang - Canada Masters (1)
  Andrei Cherkasov - Moscow (1)
  Andrei Chesnokov - Monte Carlo Masters, Tel Aviv (2)
  Francisco Clavet - Hilversum (1)
  Stefan Edberg - Indian Wells Masters, Tokyo, Wimbledon, Los Angeles, Cincinnati Masters, Long Island, Paris Masters (7)
  Franco Davín - Palermo (1)
  Scott Davis - Auckland (1)
  Guy Forget - Bordeaux (1)
  Richard Fromberg - Bologna, Båstad (2)
  Brad Gilbert - Rotterdam, Orlando, Brisbane (3)
  Andrés Gómez - Barcelona, Madrid, French Open (3)
  Jakob Hlasek - Wembley (1)
  Goran Ivanišević - Stuttgart (1)
  Martín Jaite - Guaruja, Gstaad (2)
  Anders Järryd - Vienna (1)
  Kelly Jones - Singapore (1)
  Mark Koevermans - Athens (1)
  Ramesh Krishnan - Schenectady (1)
  Magnus Larsson - Florence (1)
  Ivan Lendl - Australian Open, Milan, Toronto, London, Tokyo Indoors (5)
  Amos Mansdorf - Rosmalen (1)
  Luiz Mattar - Rio de Janeiro (1)
  John McEnroe - Basel (1)
  Thomas Muster - Adelaide, Casablanca, Rome Masters (3)
  Yannick Noah - Sydney (1)
  Karel Nováček - Munich (1)
  Horacio de la Peña - Kitzbühel (1)
  Guillermo Pérez Roldán - San Marino (1)
  Goran Prpić - Umag (1)
  Marc Rosset - Lyon (1)
  Derrick Rostagno - New Haven (1)
  Pete Sampras - Philadelphia, Manchester, US Open, Grand Slam Cup (4)
  Emilio Sánchez - Wellington, Estoril (2)
  Horst Skoff - Geneva (1)
  Michael Stich - Memphis (1)
  Jonas Svensson - Toulouse (1)
  Robbie Weiss - São Paulo (1)
  David Wheaton - Kiawah Island (1)
  Mats Wilander - Itaparica (1)

The following players won their first title:
  Pieter Aldrich
  Alex Antonitsch
  Jordi Arrese
  Andrei Cherkasov
  Francisco Clavet
  Richard Fromberg
  Goran Ivanišević
  Mark Koevermans
  Magnus Larsson
  Goran Prpić
  Derrick Rostagno
  Pete Sampras
  Michael Stich
  David Wheaton
  Robbie Weiss

See also 
 1990 WTA Tour

References

External links 
 1990 ATP Results Archive
 History Mens Professional Tours.

 
ATP Tour
ATP Tour seasons